The North Central Hardwood Forests are a temperate broadleaf and mixed forests ecoregion (no. 51 in the EPA Level III ecoregions of the  United States) in central Minnesota, central Wisconsin, and northwestern Lower Michigan, embedded between (clockwise) the Western Corn Belt Plains in the south, the Northern Glaciated Plains, the Red River Valley, the Northern Minnesota Wetlands, and the Northern Lakes and Forests (ecoregion 50, approx. identical with WWF's Western Great Lakes forests). It forms the northern part of the upper Midwest forest-savanna transition, which also includes regions 52 (Driftless Area) and 53 (Southeastern Wisconsin Till Plains).

See also
Big Woods
Upper Wolf River Stagnation Moraine
Green Bay Till and Lacustrine Plain
Door Peninsula
Hardwood
Wisconsin Department of Natural Resources
Minnesota Department of Natural Resources
Natural history of Minnesota

References

Ecoregions of the United States
Ecoregions of Michigan
Ecoregions of Minnesota
Ecoregions of Wisconsin